Ignosticism or igtheism is the idea that the question of the existence of God is meaningless because the word "God" has no coherent and unambiguous definition.

Terminology
The term ignosticism was coined in 1964 by Sherwin Wine, a rabbi and a founding figure of Humanistic Judaism.

Distinction from theological noncognitivism
Ignosticism and theological noncognitivism are similar although whereas the ignostic says "every theological position assumes too much about the concept of God", the theological noncognitivist claims to have no concept whatever to label as "a concept of God", but the relationship of ignosticism to other nontheistic views is less clear. While Paul Kurtz finds the view to be compatible with both weak atheism and agnosticism, other philosophers consider ignosticism to be distinct.

See also
 Apatheism
 Apophatism
 Conceptions of God
 Epistemology
 Ietsism
 Loki's Wager
 Pantheism
 Scientific method
 Verificationism

References

Sources

External links
 

Agnosticism
Criticism of religion
20th-century neologisms